Marlena Hilari Wesh (born February 16, 1991) is a Haitian-American sprinter who competed in the 2012 Summer Olympics for Haiti in the women's 200-meter and 400-meter sprints. She appeared on the twenty-sixth season of The Bachelor.

Early life 
Wesh was born on February 16, 1991, in Virginia Beach, Virginia. Both of her parents, Hernould and Margareth Wesh, were born and raised in Haiti and she is a dual citizen. She is one of five siblings, including fellow sprinter Darrell Wesh, and the only one to consider herself Haitian-American. She attended Landstown High School in Virginia Beach, where she was a track star, being named as the 2008-09 Gatorade Virginia Girls Track and Field Athlete of the Year and The Virginian-Pilot's 2009 Female Athlete of the Year. After graduating in 2009, she enrolled at the University of Oklahoma, where she was given a full scholarship, but she transferred and enrolled at Clemson University in South Carolina, where she majored in psychology.

Athletic career 

Wesh was approached by Haitian Olympic hurdler Nadine Faustin-Parker, who encouraged her to run for Haiti. She first competed at the Central American and Caribbean Championships in Puerto Rico in July 2011, coming in 8th place in the 400m and 13th place in the 200m. She won the 400-meter sprint for Clemson in April 2012 at the Atlantic Coast Conference (ACC) outdoor championships with a time of 51.43 seconds, which was a meet record and her 4th consecutive 400-meter ACC championship. It is a current American college record and 17th best in the world. This time made her eligible to compete in the Olympics for both Haiti and America. 

She earned All-American designation in March 2012 in a Division I championship at Boise State University in Idaho. In early July 2012, just prior to the 2012 London Olympics, Wesh ran her personal best in the 400-meters with a time of 51.23, just 0.03 seconds behind the first-place finisher, at the 2012 North America, Central America and Caribbean Under-23 Championships in Mexico. 

Four of the five athletes representing Haiti at the 2012 Olympics were not from Haiti. Wesh's brother Daren could also have run for Haiti in the 2012 Olympics but chose to try to make the American team. Wesh said, "I still feel Haitian even if I wasn't born there". On August 3, she achieved her goal of making it to the 400-meter semi-finals in the 2012 London Olympics, having come in third in her heat. On August 4, she failed to make it to the finals, placing 8th in her heat and 19th overall, with a time of 52.49.

Later career 
Wesh appeared on the twenty-sixth season of The Bachelor, competing to date Clayton Echard. She was eliminated on week 5. She works as a real estate agent in Miami, Florida, although she previously worked in corporate human resources.

Personal bests

Achievements

References

External links
 
 
 Tilastopaja biography

1991 births
Living people
Sportspeople from Virginia Beach, Virginia
Track and field athletes from Virginia
American sportspeople of Haitian descent
Haitian female sprinters
American female sprinters
Athletes (track and field) at the 2012 Summer Olympics
Olympic athletes of Haiti
Athletes (track and field) at the 2015 Pan American Games
Pan American Games competitors for Haiti
Competitors at the 2014 Central American and Caribbean Games
Clemson Tigers women's track and field athletes
Olympic female sprinters
Bachelor Nation contestants